There were 14 elections to the United States House of Representatives in 1889 to the 50th United States Congress and 51st United States Congress.  Of these, at least 10 were special elections and 4 were general elections for new states.

One of the elections was for two seats, so the total members elected were 15.

The only gains came from new seats, created for the new states of Montana,  South Dakota, North Dakota, and Washington.  From these new states, 5 new Republicans were elected to the House.

Elections are listed by date and district.

Special elections

50th Congress 

|-
! 
| Alvin P. Hovey
|  | Republican
| 1886
|  | Incumbent resigned January 17, 1889 to become Governor of Indiana.New member elected January 29, 1889.Republican hold.Successor seated February 6, 1889.Winner had not been elected to the next term, see 1888 United States House of Representatives elections in Indiana.
| nowrap | 

|-
! 
| James N. Burnes
|  | Democratic
| 1882
|  | Incumbent died January 23, 1889.elected February 19, 1889.Democratic hold.Successor seated February 25, 1889.Winner was not elected to the next term, see below.
| nowrap | 

|}

51st Congress 

|-
! 
| James N. Burnes
|  | Democratic
| 1882
|  | Incumbent member-elect died January 23, 1889.New member elected February 19, 1889 for the term starting March 4, 1889.Democratic hold.Successor seated December 2, 1889.Winner was not elected to finish the current term, see above.
| nowrap | 

|-
! 
| Richard W. Townshend
|  | Democratic
| 1876
|  | Incumbent died March 9, 1889.New member elected May 21, 1889.Democratic hold.Successor seated December 2, 1889.
| nowrap | 

|-
! 
| Thomas Ryan
|  | Republican
| 1876
|  | Incumbent resigned April 4, 1889 after being appointed U.S. Minister to Mexico.New member elected May 21, 1889.Republican hold.Successor seated December 2, 1889.
| nowrap | 

|-
! 
| Edward J. Gay
|  | Democratic
| 1884
|  | Incumbent died May 30, 1889.New member elected September 3, 1889.Democratic hold.Successor seated December 2, 1889.
| nowrap | 

|-
! 
| James Laird
|  | Republican
| 1882
|  | Incumbent died August 17, 1889.New member elected November 5, 1889.Republican hold.Successor seated December 2, 1889.
| nowrap | 

|-
! 
| Samuel S. Cox
|  | Democratic
| 1856 1864 18681885 1886
|  | Incumbent died September 10, 1889.New member elected November 5, 1889.Democratic hold.New member seated December 2, 1889.
| nowrap | 

|-
! 
| Newton W. Nutting
|  | Republican
| 18821884 1886
|  | Incumbent died October 15, 1889.New member elected November 5, 1889.Republican hold.Successor seated December 2, 1889.
| nowrap | 

|-
! 
| Frank T. Fitzgerald
|  | Democratic
| 1888
|  | Incumbent resigned November 4, 1889 to become Register of New York County.New member elected November 30, 1889.Democratic hold.New member seated December 9, 1889.
| nowrap | 

|}

Montana 

|-
! 
| colspan=3 | None 
|  | New seat.New member elected October 1, 1889.Republican gain.New member seated December 2, 1889.
| nowrap | 

|}

North Dakota 

|-
! 
| colspan=3 | None 
|  | New seat.New member elected October 1, 1889.Republican gain.New member seated December 2, 1889.
| nowrap | 

|}

South Dakota 

|-
! rowspan=2 | 
| colspan=3 | None 
|  | New seat.New member elected October 1, 1889.Republican gain.New member seated December 2, 1889.
| rowspan=2 nowrap | 

|-
| colspan=3 | None 
|  | New seat.New member elected October 1, 1889.Republican gain.New member seated December 2, 1889.

|}

Washington 

|-
! 
| colspan=3 | None 
|  | New seat.New member elected October 1, 1889.Republican gain.New member seated December 2, 1889.
| nowrap | 

|}

Notes

References 

 
1889